Highlanes Gallery is a public art gallery and visual arts exhibition centre in Drogheda, Ireland which opened 4 October 2006.

External links
 Highlanes website

2006 establishments in Ireland
Art museums and galleries in the Republic of Ireland
Art museums established in 2006
Buildings and structures in Drogheda
Tourist attractions in County Louth